Firebird and fire bird may refer to:

Mythical birds
 Phoenix (mythology), sacred firebird found in the mythologies of many cultures
 Bennu, Egyptian firebird
 Huma bird, Persian firebird
 Firebird (Slavic folklore)

Bird species
Various species with bright red or orange plumage:
 Baltimore oriole
 Scarlet tanager
 Sharp-tailed grouse
 Vermilion flycatcher

Automobiles
 Pontiac Firebird, American pony car
 General Motors Firebird, series of concept cars

Film and television
 The Firebird (1934 film), a murder mystery directed by William Dieterle
 The Firebird (1952 film), a musical drama film directed by Hasse Ekman
 Fire Birds, a 1990 action film directed by David Green
 "Firebird" (Once Upon a Time), an episode of the fifth season of Once Upon a Time
 Firebird (2021 film), a love story directed by Peeter Rebane

In print
 The Firebird and Princess Vasilisa, a Russian fairy tale by Alexander Afanasyev
 Firebird (Lackey novel), a 1996 novel retelling the Russian folk tale, by Mercedes Lackey
 Firebird (Tyers novel), a 1986 science fiction novel by Kathy Tyers
 Firebird, a 2011 science fiction novel by Jack McDevitt
 Firebirds (anthology), a 2003 collection of short stories for young adults by Firebird Books
 Firebird (Amalgam Comics), a character in the Amalgam comic books published by DC and Marvel
 Firebird (Marvel Comics), a Marvel Comics character
 Firebird Books, an imprint of Penguin launched in 2002
 Firebird (Pirotta picture book), an 2010/2014 picture book by Saviour Pirotta and Catherine Hyde

Music
 The Firebird, ballet for which Igor Stravinsky (1882–1971) composed the music
 Firebird (band), late 1990s/2000s/2010s blues-based power trio
 The Firebirds, a rock and roll band from Bristol, England
 The Firebird Band, an indie rock band hailing from Chicago, Illinois, U.S.
 Firebirds (album), a 1968 jazz album by Prince Lasha and Sonny Simmons
 Firebird (album), a 2021 album by Natalie Imbruglia
 "The Firebird", a song by Priestess from the album Prior to the Fire
 "Firebird", a song by Galantis from the album Pharmacy
 Fire Bird (Miyavi album), album by Miyavi
 "Firebird", a song by Owl City from the album Cinematic
 "Firebirds", a song by Clutch from the album Psychic Warfare

Instrument
 Firebird (trumpet), a trumpet with valves and slide
 Gibson Firebird, an electric guitar from the 1960s

Software
 Firebird (database server), a relational database management system
 Firebird, a video game label formerly owned by Telecomsoft
 Hi no Tori, known as Firebird in Europe, a computer game developed by Konami Japan in 1987
 Mozilla Firebird, former name of the Mozilla Firefox browser
 Firebird BBS, one of two main telnet-based systems developed in Taiwan
 Space Firebird, a 1980 arcade game developed by Nintendo R&D1
 Firebirds (video game), computer game for the ZX Spectrum released in 1983
 Firebird (emulator), open source emulator for the TI-Nspire series calculator

Sport
 Albany Firebirds, an American Arena Football team
 Coachella Valley Firebirds, a team in the American Hockey league.
 Firebird International Raceway, a dragstrip and motorsports park in Phoenix, Arizona, U.S.
 Firebird Skydiving, an American manufacturer of skydiving equipment
 Flint Firebirds, a team in the Ontario Hockey League, Canada
 Indiana Firebirds, a former Arena Football team, Indiana, U.S.
 Phoenix Firebirds, a former Minor League Baseball team, Phoenix, Arizona, U.S.
 Queensland Firebirds, an Australian netball team based in Brisbane, Queensland, Australia
 UDC Firebirds, University of the District of Columbia Athletics program, U.S.
 Wellington Firebirds, a cricket team based in Wellington, New Zealand
 Lancaster Firebirds youth hockey program in Lancaster, Pennsylvania, U.S.

Other uses
 AAM-A-1 Firebird, an American air-to-air missile of the 1940s
 Chengdu J-10, NATO reporting name: FIrebird, a combat aircraft
 Northrop Grumman Firebird, a reconnaissance and surveillance aircraft developed by Northrop Grumman
 FIREBIRD is the callsign for CargoLogicAir
 Firebird (roller coaster), a B&M Floorless Coaster at Six Flags America in Maryland.

See also

 Fire (disambiguation)
 Bird (disambiguation)
 
 
 Phoenix (disambiguation)
 Redbird (disambiguation)